The Downlands Countryside Management Project established in 1988 is a partnership between six London and Surrey local authorities set up to manage an area of countryside of 130 km² across the south of Outer London.

The main aims are the management of the rare chalk downland within the area; the  development of an extensive network of trails (including the London Loop); and the  improvements to signposting; rights of way; woodland and pond management.

The Project is supported by the boroughs of Sutton and Croydon; and by Surrey County Council; the City of London Corporation; the Surrey districts of Reigate and Banstead and Tandridge; and the Countryside Agency. An additional partner is Natural Britain.

References

External links
Press release

Parks and open spaces in the London Borough of Sutton
Parks and open spaces in the London Borough of Croydon
Geography of Surrey